The Simon E. Dow House (also known as the Dow House) is a historic house located on Prince Street in Dow City, Iowa.

The two-story, 13-room, red brick house was built in 1872 by Simon E. Dow (Simeon E. Dow), who in 1869 co-founded Dow City and later became one of its leading businessmen. In 1970, it was bought by the Crawford County Conservation Board to be restored and is now open for public tours.

References

External links

Crawford County Conservation Board website about the house, includes house museum hours

National Register of Historic Places in Crawford County, Iowa
Houses on the National Register of Historic Places in Iowa
Historic American Buildings Survey in Iowa
Houses in Crawford County, Iowa
Houses completed in 1872
Historic house museums in Iowa
Museums in Crawford County, Iowa